Dr. Manoj Rajoria (born 19 December 1969) is an indian politician and a member of parliament to the 16th Lok Sabha from Karauli-Dholpur (Lok Sabha constituency), Rajasthan. He won the 2014 Indian general election as a Bharatiya Janata Party candidate.

Early life and education 
He was born in Jaipur and did his schooling at Maheshwari Higher Secondary School, Jaipur in 1987. He took his B.H.M.S M.D.(Homeopathy) at Dr. M.P.K. Homeopathic Medical college, Jaipur in 2006.

He is married to Sunita Rajoria. He is giving services as a homeopath to peoples from last 11 years. He also established a clinic named "SHANTI HOMEOS", located at Vaishali Nagar, Jaipur. The name of the clinic was kept on the name of his mother, "Shanti". He is also working as a "Karyakarta" of Bhartiya Janata Party from last 10 years. He is also working as member of Rashtriya Swaymsevak Sangh (RSS) from young age.

Political career 
He won the Indian General Election, 2014 as a Bhartiya Janta Party(BJP) candidate and became Member of Parliament of the 16th Lok Sabha from Karuali - Dholpur (Lok Sabha Constituency, Rajasthan

Member
Member of Parliament since 2014.
Rajbhasha Committee of Ministry of Home Affairs (India) since 2019.

References

India MPs 2014–2019
People from Dholpur district
Lok Sabha members from Rajasthan
Living people
1969 births
Bharatiya Janata Party politicians from Rajasthan
Politicians from Jaipur
India MPs 2019–present